Philadelphia Experiment II (also known as  Philadelphia Experiment 2) is a 1993 American science fiction film. It is the sequel to The Philadelphia Experiment (1984), with an entirely new cast and only two characters returning. It stars Brad Johnson as David Herdeg (the hero from the first film) and Gerrit Graham in a dual role as both the main villain and his father.

Plot
It is nine years after the events that thrust David Herdeg into 1984, where he met and later married Allison. She has since died, and David is living alone with their son, Benjamin. His business is slowly failing, Ben's school attendance has dropped and the banks are threatening to foreclose on his house; however, he refuses financial help from Professor Longstreet, the original project director, in exchange for rejoining the U.S. Navy. In addition to this, he has also been having painful experiences which Longstreet rationalizes as stress-related hallucinations. Unbeknownst to Herdeg, Longstreet has been doing some research of his own.

In a demonstration, engineer William Mailerson of Friedrich Mahler, a Nazi scientist who worked on a project similar to the Philadelphia Experimentuses the technology as a demonstration for a potential teleportation attack-defense strategy. The concept was to beam a bomber into a high-risk area to surprise enemy air defenses, attacking before they could react. To demonstrate, he beams a model aircraft across a room. Despite getting significant interest, Longstreet manages to convince the panel that the technology is too dangerous to use. It is then revealed that Longstreet himself gave Mailer the necessary equipment – on condition that they be used only for test purposes. It is these tests that David is experiencing.

Herdeg, furious to learn that Longstreet has lied to him, packs to leave California, hoping to get far enough away from the experiment. Mailer, on the clock to vindicate his work, uses the technology to transmit an F-117 Nighthawk, but the aircraft does not rematerialize. David feels tremendous physical pain as the world around him changes and Ben disappears.

David finds himself in a different 1993, on the run from a heavily armed military team. He is rescued by Jess, a member of an underground resistance group, who explains that Nazi Germany won World War II and is about to mark 50 years of Nazi rule over America. Jews, African-Americans, and other ethnic minorities are being sent to concentration camps, while all citizens suffer under an oppressive puppet government.

Germany had won the war using a futuristic aircraft called the Phoenix to deliver atomic bombs, destroying Washington, D.C., and other major targets on the east coast. The United States, United Kingdom, Soviet Union and other Allied nations then surrendered to Nazi Germany. The Phoenix was destroyed in an explosion and Friedrich Mahler, the scientist who took credit for building it, was ridiculed since he was unable to reproduce "his" successful design.

The aircraft was the same F-117 from Mailer's beaming experiment, accidentally sent back in time. His test of the device was meant to transport the F-117, with a payload of nuclear weapons, to Ramstein Air Base in Germany. While the aircraft was successfully teleported to Ramstein, it was also transferred through time, arriving in 1943 Nazi Germany. Mahler found it and told the Nazis that it was his invention.

Because of Herdeg's unique blood, he still knows the original history, and is recruited by Longstreetthe leader of the resistance groupto go back in time and prevent the Nazi's use of the F-117. The revised Mailer has developed the same beaming experiment, but has also studied the Philadelphia Experiment, and knows that an injection of Herdeg's blood will allow him to travel through time using the beam. When the resistance attacks Mailer's base, in its effort to send Herdeg back, Herdeg is captured by Mailer, who draws a vial of blood. As Jess and the others are gunned down, Herdeg escapes and travels back. Mailer soon follows.

Herdeg is warped back to the night before the F-117 leaves for the attack on Washington. Mailer meets his fatherMahler. Mailer tries to explain to a disbelieving Mahler as to who he is, and tries to explain the fate of the Phoenix. While they are talking, Herdeg successfully destroys the aircraft and attempts to escape through the time portal. However, Mailer shoots and wounds Herdeg, knocking him to the ground. Before Mailer can deliver a kill shot, Herdeg is able to shoot and kill Mahler. This erases Mailer from existence, and Herdeg crawls into the portal. Herdeg returns to the (mostly) original America in 1993, meeting Ben at his Little League gamebemused to see that Jess is now the mother of one of Ben's teammates.

Cast

 Brad Johnson as David Herdeg
 Marjean Holden as Jess
 Gerrit Graham as Dr. William Mailer / Friedrich Mahler
 John Christian Graas as Benjamin
 Cyril O'Reilly as Decker
 Geoffrey Blake as Logan
 Lisa Robins as Scotch
 David Wells as Pinstripes
 Larry Cedar as Hank, The Controller
 Al Pugliese as Coach
 James Greene as Professor Longstreet

Language note
At a crucial moment in 1943 Germany, Mailer has a conversation in German – without subtitles – with Mahler. Mailer tries to explain, in faltering German, that he is Mahler's son and that he needs to tell him what happened to the aircraft during the bombing run. Mahler responds in German that he has no son. Once Mahler is shot and killed, Mailer ceases to exist.

See also

 Hypothetical Axis victory in World War II — includes an extensive list of other Wikipedia articles regarding works of Nazi Germany / Axis / World War II alternate history

External links
 
 
 

1993 films
1993 independent films
1990s science fiction action films
Alternate Nazi Germany films
American alternate history films
American independent films
American science fiction films
American aviation films
American sequel films
American dystopian films
Films about time travel
Films set in 1943
Films set in 1993
American World War II films
Trimark Pictures films
1990s English-language films
1990s American films